Thomas Gamiette (born 21 June 1986) is a Guadeloupe international footballer who plays as a defensive midfielder for Championnat National 2 side FC Fleury 91. He previously played in Ligue 2 for Reims, Tours, Paris FC and Bourg-en-Bresse, and in the Thai Premier League for BEC Tero Sasana.

International career

International goals
Scores and results list Guadeloupe's goal tally first.

References

1986 births
Living people
Sportspeople from Épinay-sur-Seine
Association football defenders
French footballers
French people of Guadeloupean descent
Guadeloupean footballers
Guadeloupe international footballers
Entente SSG players
Stade de Reims players
Tours FC players
Football Bourg-en-Bresse Péronnas 01 players
FC Fleury 91 players
2009 CONCACAF Gold Cup players
2011 CONCACAF Gold Cup players
Ligue 2 players
Expatriate footballers in Thailand
Footballers from Seine-Saint-Denis